Darren Joseph Eliot (born November 26, 1961) is a Canadian sports broadcaster and a former professional ice hockey goaltender. He played 88 games in the National Hockey League for the Los Angeles Kings, Detroit Red Wings, and Buffalo Sabres between 1984 and 1989. Internationally he played for the Canadian national team at the 1984 Winter Olympics. He currently serves as Vice President of Hockey Programming and Facility Operations for the Vegas Golden Knights.

Playing career

College
Eliot was born in Milton, Ontario. He graduated from Cornell University in 1983 with a degree in agricultural economics, having been elected to the Sphinx Head Society during his senior year.  He earned membership into the Red Key Society for students exemplifying excellence in academics and athletics.  With the Cornell Big Red men's ice hockey team, he was a two-time All-Ivy selection and was named an All-American as a senior. He was inducted into the Cornell Athletic Hall of Fame in 1996.

NHL career
Eliot was drafted in the sixth round, 115th overall, by the Los Angeles Kings in the 1980 NHL Entry Draft.  Eliot played in the National Hockey League with the Kings, Detroit Red Wings, and Buffalo Sabres. Eliot played in 89 games and accumulated a record of 25–41–12.

International career
Eliot represented Team Canada at the 1984 Winter Olympics.

Post-playing career

Detroit Red Wings
On September 12, 2014, it was announced that Eliot was named the new Director of Minor Hockey Operations for Little Caesars Amateur Hockey. In his new role, Eliot will oversee the day-to-day operations of the Little Caesars AAA hockey program and the Little Caesars Amateur Hockey League (LCAHL), along with serving as the organization's representative to USA Hockey, the Michigan Amateur Hockey Association (MAHA) and the High Performance Hockey League (HPHL).

Vegas Golden Knights
On February 13, 2019, it was announced that Eliot was named Vice President of Hockey Programming and Facility Operations for the Vegas Golden Knights. He will also oversee the Vegas Jr. Golden Knights program as the club's executive director.

Broadcasting career
Eliot worked as an in-studio analyst for Fox Sports Detroit's coverage of the Detroit Red Wings. He also contributes as an online columnist for Sports Illustrated. Previously, he worked as a national color analyst for Versus as well as locally for the Atlanta Thrashers telecasts on Fox Sports South and SportSouth. He also does occasional work for the Big Ten Network. Eliot served as the Ice Level Reporter for the 2016 Stanley Cup Finals on NBC Sports Radio.

Career statistics

Regular season and playoffs

International

Awards and honors

References

External links
 
 Darren Eliot @ hockeygoalies.org
 Article mentioning his participation in the 1984 Winter Olympics
 Archive of writing for Sports Illustrated and biography

1961 births
Living people
AHCA Division I men's ice hockey All-Americans
Adirondack Red Wings players
Atlanta Thrashers announcers
Buffalo Sabres players
Canadian ice hockey goaltenders
Cornell Big Red men's ice hockey players
Detroit Red Wings players
Ice hockey people from Ontario
Ice hockey players at the 1984 Winter Olympics
Los Angeles Kings draft picks
Los Angeles Kings players
New Haven Nighthawks players
Olympic ice hockey players of Canada
Rochester Americans players
Sportspeople from Milton, Ontario